The 2018 CONCACAF Women's U-17 Championship was the 6th edition of the CONCACAF Women's U-17 Championship, the biennial international youth football championship organized by CONCACAF for the women's under-17 national teams of the North, Central American and Caribbean region. The tournament was initially to be hosted by Nicaragua, and was planned to take place between 19–29 April 2018, as announced by CONCACAF on 5 December 2017. A total of eight teams participated in the tournament.

On 22 April 2018, four days into the tournament, CONCACAF announced the remainder of the championship was cancelled immediately due to security concerns caused by civil unrest in Nicaragua. On 11 May 2018, CONCACAF announced the tournament would resume play on 6 June and conclude on 12 June 2018, with the remainder of the tournament hosted at the IMG Academy in Bradenton, Florida, United States. Six teams played in the remainder of the tournament, as Nicaragua and Puerto Rico were already eliminated and were set to face each other in their last match.

The top three teams of the tournament qualified for the 2018 FIFA U-17 Women's World Cup in Uruguay as the CONCACAF representatives.

Defending champions United States defeated Mexico in the final to win their fourth title.

Qualification

Regional qualification tournaments were held to determine the teams playing in the final tournament.

Qualified teams
The following eight teams qualified for the final tournament.

Venues
All matches of the original tournament in Nicaragua were played at Nicaragua National Football Stadium in Managua. All matches of the rescheduled tournament were played at IMG Academy in Bradenton, Florida.

Draw
The draw of the tournament was held on 31 January 2018, 15:00 EST (UTC−5), at the CONCACAF Headquarters in Miami.

The eight teams were drawn into two groups of four teams. Tournament hosts Nicaragua were seeded in position A1, while defending champions United States were seeded in position B1. The remaining six teams were allocated to pots 2–3, and drawn to the remaining six positions.

Squads

Players born on or after 1 January 2001 are eligible to compete in the tournament. Each team must register a squad of 20 players, two of whom must be goalkeepers (Regulations Articles 15.C.2).

Group stage
The top two teams of each group advance to the semi-finals.

Tiebreakers
Teams are ranked according to points (3 points for a win, 1 point for a draw, 0 points for a loss), and if tied on points, the following tiebreaking criteria are applied, in the order given, to determine the rankings (Regulations Article 18.A.5):
Points in head-to-head matches among tied teams;
Goal difference in head-to-head matches among tied teams;
Goals scored in head-to-head matches among tied teams;
Goal difference in all group matches;
Goals scored in all group matches;
Drawing of lots.

All times are local, CST (UTC−6) for Nicaragua and EDT (UTC−4) for the United States.

Group A

Group B

Knockout stage
In the semi-finals, if the match is level at the end of 90 minutes, no extra time is played and the match is decided by a penalty shoot-out. In the third place match and final, if the match is level at the end of 90 minutes, extra time is played, and if still tied after extra time, the match is decided by a penalty shoot-out (Regulations Articles 11.C and 11.D).

Bracket

Semi-finals
Winners qualify for 2018 FIFA U-17 Women's World Cup.

Third place match
Winner qualifies for 2018 FIFA U-17 Women's World Cup.

Final

Winners

Qualified teams for FIFA U-17 Women's World Cup
The following three teams from CONCACAF qualified for the 2018 FIFA U-17 Women's World Cup.

1 Bold indicates champions for that year. Italic indicates hosts for that year.

Goalscorers

5 goals

 Melchie Dumornay
 Alison González
 Sunshine Fontes

4 goals

 Natalia Mauleón

3 goals

 Andersen Williams
 María Paula Salas
 Flero Surpris
 Nayeli Díaz
 Nicole Pérez
 Maya Doms

2 goals

 Kaila Novak
 Priscila Chinchilla
 Aylin Avilez
 Mia Fishel
 Reilyn Turner

1 goal

 Jadae Steede Hill
 Leilanni Nesbeth
 Teni Akindoju
 Jordyn Huitema
 Jayde Riviere
 Daniela Contreras
 Carmen Marín
 Milan Pierre
 Vanessa Buso
 Reyna Reyes
 Anette Vázquez
 Isabel Cacho
 Hannah Bebar
 Sophia Jones
 Samantha Kroeger
 Payton Linnehan
 Makenna Morris
 Diana Ordoñez
 Kennedy Wesley
 Astrid Wheeler

1 own goal

 Jeimy Umaña 
 Valeria Roblero

Awards
The following awards were given at the conclusion of the tournament.

Best XI
Goalkeeper:  Angelina Anderson
Right Back:  Reyna Reyes
Center Back:  Kennedy Wesley
Center Back:  Tanna Sánchez
Left Back:  Kate Wiesner
Center Midfielder:  Sophia Jones
Center Midfielder:  Melchie Dumornay
Center Midfielder:  Nicole Pérez
Winger/Right Midfielder:  Samantha Meza
Winger/Left Midfielder:  Natalia Mauleón
Forward:  Sunshine Fontes

Notes

References

External links
Under 17s – Women, CONCACAF.com

 
2018
Women's U-17 Championship
2018 in women's association football
2018 in youth association football
2018 in American women's soccer
International association football competitions hosted by Nicaragua
International women's association football competitions hosted by the United States
April 2018 sports events in North America
June 2018 sports events in the United States